Makanek, also known as Na'anik, is a type of Arabic sausage. It is made from a combination of spiced ground meat (traditionally lamb and beef) filled into a sheep casing. The casing is then fried to create a sausage. The dish can be spiced with pine nuts, cumin, cloves, cinnamon, nutmeg, vinegar, and can be cooked with wine. Mankanek is traditionally served with a pomegranate molasses.

Further reading 
Published recipe for Na'anik

References 

Lebanese sausages
Lebanese cuisine